Andrew Alexander "Spuds" Hebenton (October 3, 1929 – January 29, 2019) was a Canadian professional ice hockey right winger, and holds the record for the longest streak without missing a game in professional hockey history.

Playing career
After playing junior hockey for a local Winnipeg team, Hebenton made his professional debut in 1949 for the Cincinnati Mohawks of the American Hockey League. The following season he moved on to the Victoria Cougars of the Pacific Coast Hockey League (subsequently renamed the Western Hockey League (WHL). He starred with Victoria for five seasons, his best year being 1955, when he scored 46 goals and was named to the league's First All-Star team.

The following season his rights were purchased by the New York Rangers of the NHL, for whom he played for eight seasons. Hebenton scored his first NHL goal on October 16, 1955, in New York's 4-1 loss at Boston.  He scored twenty goals or more in five of those seasons, his best year coming in 1958–59, when he scored 33 goals and 29 assists and was the runner up for the Lady Byng Memorial Trophy for gentlemanly play, which he had won in 1956-57. After the 1962–63 season, the Boston Bruins acquired Hebenton in the waiver draft, for whom he played his final NHL season. He played 630 straight NHL games in all, breaking the record for the most consecutive games (a mark subsequently broken by Garry Unger in the 1970s and currently held by Keith Yandle).

Hebenton's rights were sold by Boston after the 1963–64 season to the Portland Buckaroos of the WHL, and he remained in Portland for the rest of the league's history (barring two seasons back in Victoria), becoming one of the WHL's all-time leading scorers and perennial stars, and missing only two games.  He was a perennial winner of the Fred Hume Cup for gentlemanly play, winning it nearly half the seasons it was offered, the final time when he was 43 years old.

From the 1953 season, with the Cougars, through to the end of the 1967 season, Hebenton played at least 1,054 consecutive regular season professional games; including playoff games, Hebenton played 1,076 consecutive professional games.

Retirement
When the WHL folded in 1974, Hebenton played four games for the Seattle Totems in the Central Hockey League to wrap up his professional career, having played 26 professional seasons in all, a mark exceeded only by Gordie Howe and Jaromir Jagr in hockey history.  He played two seasons for a version of the Buckaroos in semi-pro leagues before hanging up his skates for good.

In all, Hebenton played in 630 NHL games, scoring 189 goals and 202 assists for 391 points.  He likewise played in 1056 PCHL/WHL games, scoring 425 goals and 532 assists for 957 points.  Hebenton's remarkable consecutive games streak lasted at least from the 1952 season through to the end of the 1967 season—he missed three games in 1951 for the Victoria Cougars and two games in 1967/1968 with the Portland Buckaroos-so the streak was likely longer, for an unrivalled total of at least 1,054 consecutive games.  By contrast, Doug Jarvis' professional streak—the second longest in history—is 988 games. He died on January 29, 2019, in at an assisted living facility in Gresham, Oregon, at the age of 89.

Hebenton was inducted into the Manitoba Sports Hall of Fame in 2009.

Career achievements
MJHL Second All-Star Team (1949)
PCHL Championship (1951)
WHL Championships (1965 & 1966)
WHL Second All-Star Team (1955, 1965 & 1970)
WHL First All-Star Team (1971 & 1973)
Lady Byng Trophy (1957)
Played in NHL All-Star Game in 1960
Fred Hume Cup Winner (Most Gentlemanly Player WHL) (1965, 1970, 1971, 1972, 1973 & 1974)
Currently fifth all-time in NHL for consecutive games played
Fourth all-time in WHL games played, third in goals scored, eighth in assists and fourth in points scored.
Honoured Member of the Manitoba Hockey Hall of Fame
 In the 2009 book 100 Ranger Greats, was ranked No. 53 all-time of the 901 New York Rangers who had played during the team's first 82 seasons

Family
Hebenton's son Clay was a professional hockey goaltender between 1973–1980, most notably as the starting goaltender for the World Hockey Association's Phoenix Roadrunners in the 1977 season.

Career statistics

Regular season and playoffs

References

External links
 

1929 births
2019 deaths
Boston Bruins players
Canadian expatriate ice hockey players in the United States
Canadian ice hockey left wingers
Cincinnati Mohawks (AHL) players
Lady Byng Memorial Trophy winners
New York Rangers players
Portland Buckaroos players
Seattle Totems (CHL) players
Ice hockey people from Winnipeg
Winnipeg Canadians players
Victoria Cougars (1949–1961) players